Xavier Leitl was a West German bobsledder who competed in the early 1950s. He won a gold medal in the four-man event at the 1951 FIBT World Championships in the Alpe d'Huez, France.

References
Bobsleigh four-man world championship medalists since 1930

German male bobsledders
Possibly living people
Year of birth missing